Rae Berger or Rhea Berger (March 26, 1877 – November 9, 1931) was an early silent film actor and director. He is erroneously listed in Duke University's "Women Film Pioneers"; he was in fact male. He married actress Mary Martin.

Director filmography
Danger Within (1918)
The Magic Eye (1918)
The Valley of Decision (1916)
Bluff (1916)
The Voice of Love (1916)
The Three Pals (1916)
A Million for Mary (1916)
Purity (1916)
The Overcoat (1916) (as Rhea Berger)

Actor filmography
The Craving (1916) .... Leroy Calhoun
The First Quarrel (1916)
Author! Author! (1915) .... Marcellus M. Peckinpaw
Two Hearts and a Thief (1915)
Johnny the Barber (1915)
An Auto-Bungalow Fracas (1915)
Mother's Busy Week (1915)
Love, Mumps and Bumps (1915)
Incognito (1915)

External links

1877 births
1931 deaths
American male silent film actors
Silent film directors
20th-century American male actors